Immigration to Germany, both in the country's modern borders and the many political entities that preceded it, has occurred throughout the country's history. Today, Germany is one of the most popular destinations for immigrants in the world, with well over 1 million people moving there each year since 2013. As of 2019, around 13.7 million people living in Germany, or about 17% of the population, are first-generation immigrants.

Even before Germany's formal founding in 1871, its predecessor states, such as the Holy Roman Empire and the German Confederation, were destinations for immigrants. Early examples include Protestants seeking religious freedom and refugees from the partitions of Poland. Jewish immigration, mostly from Eastern Europe, was also significant. In the 20th century, rising antisemitism and xenophobia resulted in the mass emigration of German Jews and culminated in the Holocaust, in which almost all remaining German Jews and many other religious or ethnic groups, such as German Roma, were systematically murdered. In the decades since, Germany has experienced renewed immigration, particularly from Eastern and Southern Europe, Turkey and the Middle East. Since 1990, Germany has consistently ranked as one of the five most popular destination countries for immigrants in the world. According to the federal statistics office in 2016, over one in five Germans has at least partial roots outside of the country.

In modern Germany, immigration has generally risen and fallen with the country's economy. The economic boom of the 2010s, coupled with the elimination of working visa requirements for many EU citizens, brought a sustained inflow from elsewhere in Europe. Separate from economic trends, the country has also seen several distinct major waves of immigration. These include the forced resettlement of ethnic Germans from eastern Europe after World War II, the guest worker programme of the 1950s–1970s, and ethnic Germans from former Communist states claiming their right of return after the breakup of the Soviet Union. Germany also accepted significant numbers of refugees from the Yugoslav wars in the 1990s and the Syrian civil war in the 2010s.

Motivated in part by low birth rates and labour shortages, German government policy towards immigration has generally been relatively liberal since the 1950s, although conservative politicians resisted the normalisation of Germany as a country of immigrants and citizenship laws accordingly remained relatively restrictive until the mid-2000s. A major reform of immigration law in 2005 saw the state commit, for the first time, resources to the integration of newcomers and significantly liberalised the labour market for skilled professionals while restricting it for unskilled labourers. Smaller immigration reforms in 2009, 2012 and 2020 contributed to the broad trend of liberalisation, although there continue to be calls for a more comprehensive reform, especially to simplify the accreditation of foreign qualifications and make it easier for companies to employ non-EU citizens.

History of immigration to Germany

Pre-Unification 
The Counter-Reformation in the 16th and 17th centuries led large numbers of Protestants to settle in Protestant — or at least religiously tolerant — principalities and cities of the Holy Roman Empire, much of which would later become Germany. According to one estimate, a total of 100,000 Protestants moved from Habsburg lands to what is now southern and central Germany in the 17th century.

Large numbers of Huguenots also fled France after the St. Bartholomew's Day massacre in 1572, around 40,000 of whom settled in what is now Germany. Although many returned to France after the 1598 Edict of Nantes, which proclaimed a policy of religious tolerance towards Huguenots, repeated waves of conflict and persecution over the next few centuries spurred new waves of emigration. Brandenburg-Prussia, Hesse-Kassel, Brandenburg-Bayreuth, and Hanover were major destinations of Huguenots during this time.

Several thousand English and Scottish Presbyterians also fled the violent reign of Mary Tudor; many settled in Frankfurt. Many Dutch Calvinists settled in northwestern Germany after the Dutch Revolt.

After World War II until reunification (1945-1990)

Forced emigration of ethnic Germans from eastern and central Europe 

Towards the end of World War II, and in its aftermath, up to 12 million refugees of ethnic Germans, so-called "Heimatvertriebene" (German for "expellees", literally "homeland displaced persons") were forced to migrate from the former German areas, as for instance Silesia or East Prussia, to the new formed States of post-war Germany and Allied-occupied Austria, because of changing borderlines in Europe.

Guest worker programs 

Due to a shortage of laborers during the Wirtschaftswunder ("economic miracle") in the 1950s and 1960s, the West German government signed bilateral recruitment agreements with Italy in 1955, Greece in 1960, Turkey in 1961, Morocco in 1963, Portugal in 1964, Tunisia in 1965 and Yugoslavia in 1968. These agreements allowed German companies to recruit foreign citizens to work in Germany. The work permits were at first issued for a duration of two years, after which the recruited workers were supposed to return to their home countries. However, many companies repeatedly renewed the work permits; some of the bilateral treaties were even updated to give workers permanent residency upon arrival. As a result, even though many did ultimately return to their countries of origin, several million of the recruited workers and their families ended up settling in Germany permanently. Nevertheless, the government continued to encourage the public perception of the arriving immigrants as temporary guest workers (Gastarbeiter) and for many years made little provision for their integration into German society.

East Germany set up similar foreign recruitment schemes, although at much smaller scales and exclusively with other socialist states. Most foreign workers recruited to East Germany, known locally as Vertragsarbeiter, came from North Vietnam (ca. 60,000), Cuba (30,000), Mozambique (21,000) and Angola (6,000). The government portrayed East Germany as a post-racial society and called the foreign workers socialist "friends" who would learn skills which could then be applied in their home countries. In reality, racism and exploitation were widespread. The workers were generally strictly segregated from locals and did menial work that locals refused to do. Considerable portions of their paychecks were often diverted to their home governments, making their livelihoods precarious. Following German reunification in 1990, many of the roughly 90,000 foreign workers living in what had been East Germany had no legal status as immigrant workers under the Western system. Consequently, many faced deportation or premature termination of residence and work permits, as well as open discrimination in the workplace and racism in everyday life. The vast majority ultimately returned to their home countries.

Immigration from East Germany to West Germany 
During the 1980s, a small but steady stream of East Germans immigrating to the West (Übersiedler) had begun with the gradual opening of the Eastern bloc. In 1990, the year of German reunification, the number swelled to 389,000.

Aussiedler 

As Eastern bloc countries gradually began to open their borders in the 1980s, large numbers of ethnic Germans from these countries began to move to Germany. German law at the time recognized an almost unlimited right of return for people of German descent, of whom there were several million in the Soviet Union, Poland and Romania. Germany initially received around 40,000 per year. In 1987, the number doubled, in 1988 it doubled again and in 1990 nearly 400,000 immigrated.
Upon arrival, ethnic Germans became citizens at once according to Article 116 of the Basic Law, and received financial and many social benefits, including language training, as many did not speak German. Social integration was often difficult, even though ethnic Germans were entitled to German citizenship, but to many Germans they did not seem German. In 1991, restrictions went into effect, in that ethnic Germans were assigned to certain areas, losing benefits if they were moving. The German government also encouraged the estimated several million ethnic Germans living in the former Soviet Union and Eastern Europe to remain there. Since January 1993, no more than 220,000 ethnic Germans may immigrate per year. In total, more than 4.5 million ethnic Germans moved to Germany between 1990 and 2007.

Refugees 

And in parallel, a third stream of immigration starting in the mid-1980s were war refugees, of which West Germany accepted more than any other West European country due to a nearly unqualified right to asylum. Around 300,000 Iranians fled from persecution in the wake of the Iranian Revolution between 1979 and 1986 alone. Notable numbers of asylum seekers came from Turkey after a military coup in 1980 and, separately, due to ongoing persecution of Turkish Kurds in the country. Several thousand people also sought refuge in Germany from the Lebanese Civil War.

1990–present

Yugoslav refugees 

Due to the outbreak of the Yugoslav Wars in 1991, large numbers of refugees headed to Germany and other European countries. Between 1990 and 1992 nearly 900,000 people sought asylum in a united Germany. In 1992 Germany admitted almost 70 percent of all asylum seekers registered in the European Community. By comparison, only about 100,000 people sought asylum in the U.S in the same year. 
The growing numbers of asylum seekers led the Bundestag to significantly curtail the previously unqualified right to asylum in Germany, which former German refugees had "held sacred because of their reliance on it to escape the Nazi regime" and which required a constitutional amendment. Applications from people entering Germany after passing through other European Community member states, where they theoretically could have already applied for asylum, were now refused, as were applications from nationals of designated safe countries.

Though only about 5 percent of the asylum applications were approved and appeals sometimes took years to be processed, many asylum seekers were able to stay in Germany and received financial and social aid from the government.

2015 Migration crisis 

In June 2015, new arrivals of asylum seekers, which had been increasing steadily for years, began to rise sharply, driven especially by refugees fleeing wars in Syria, Iraq and Afghanistan. An original projection of 450,000 asylum seekers entering Germany for the whole of 2015 was revised upwards to 800,000 in August and again in September to over 1 million. The actual final number was 1.1 million; Germany spent about €16 billion (0.5% of GDP) on processing and housing refugees that year.

Most of the refugees entering Europe around this time came by land via the so-called "Balkan route." According to an EU law (the Dublin regulation), refugees were required to file asylum claims in the first EU country they set foot in, which for many was Hungary, and remain there while the claim is processed. As a result, Hungary registered 150,000 asylum seekers by August 2015. However, the vast majority of these refugees had no desire to remain in Hungary and wanted to move on to Western or Northern Europe, leading to a sizable population of refugees "trapped" in the country. The Hungarian government began to house refugees in camps under squalid conditions. The German Federal Office for Migration and Refugees, overwhelmed with the task of processing the sheer number of incoming asylum claims, was unable to prioritize deporting refugees to Hungary and decided to suspend enforcement of the Dublin regulation for Syrian nationals. As a result, refugees in Hungary requested to be allowed leave for Germany; several thousand began making their way across Hungary and Austria towards Germany on foot. Claiming it was no longer able to process asylum claims properly, Hungary began providing buses for refugees to the Austrian border. Responding to a wave of public sympathy in reaction to widely broadcast scenes of police brutality and refugees dying at the hands of smugglers in Hungary, and unable to keep the migrants out of the country without resorting to brutal force, the German and Austrian chancellors, Angela Merkel and Werner Faymann decided to allow the refugees in. The publicity from this decision led hundreds of thousands of people fleeing the Syrian civil war to make for Germany.

Although the number of refugees in formal employment more than tripled between 2016 and 2019, as a group they remain overrepresented in unemployment statistics, which experts ascribe to a combination of red tape and refugees' difficulty in finding housing. Employment among Syrians and Afghans, the most two common nationalities among the 2015-2016 refugee arrivals, rose by 79% and 40%, respectively, between 2017 and 2018.

The 2018 Ellwangen police raid, in which residents of a migrant shelter rioted to prevent police from deporting an asylum seeker whose claim had been deemed invalid, sparked a significant political debate.

In 2015, most Germans were very supportive of the large numbers of refugees arriving in Germany. Then-chancellor Angela Merkel declared in a speech, “Wir schaffen das" (roughly, "we can do this"), which was widely used by news media as well as the public as a defining statement of her policy during the crisis. In 2015, the brunt of the European immigration crisis was placed on Germany when 890,000 refugees crossed the border and applied for asylum, most of them fleeing from the Syrian War. By 2018, 670,000 out of 700,000 Syrians living in Germany immigrated as a result of internal strife and conflict in Syria beginning in 2011. A 2015 survey shows that 46% of the entire German population was facilitating help in some way for refugees. All over, German citizens were creating initiatives and support groups for asylum seekers as well as donating their time to help on-site with refugees. Media helped shape German attitudes as well as put pressure on the government by covering the victims of immigration and by showing individual stories, which humanized them.

The widespread sexual assaults on New Year's Eve of 2015, for which a significant number of suspects were asylum seekers, marked a shift in the tone of media coverage and public opinion towards refugees, though the government noted refugees were, statistically, no more likely than locals to commit crimes.

Since then, Germany's intake of refugees has consistently dropped each year, while deportations increased and leveled out at around 20,000.

Refugees of the Russo-Ukrainian War 

On 24 February 2022, Russia invaded Ukraine in a major escalation of the Russo-Ukrainian War, which began in 2014. In addition to tens of thousands of deaths on both sides, this invasion has caused Europe's largest refugee crisis since World War II, with around 7.5 million Ukrainians fleeing the country and a third of the population displaced. Accordingly, by October of 2022, Germany had recorded net immigration of 750,000 people from Ukraine in the first half of 2022, according to the office, responsible for collecting information on German society, economy, and the environment. That influx pushed Germany's population growth to 1%, or about 843,000 people, in the first half of the year. Germany's population rose to an all-time high of 84.3 million people in 2022.

Demographics 
As of 2014, about 16.3 million people with an immigrant background were living in Germany, accounting for every fifth person. Of those 16.3 million, 8.2 million had no German citizenship, more than ever before. Most of them had Turkish, Eastern European or Southern European background. The majority of new foreigners coming to Germany in 2014 were from new EU member states such as Poland, Romania, Bulgaria and Croatia, non-EU European countries like Albania, North Macedonia, Switzerland and Norway or from the Middle East, Africa, East Asia, South Asia, Southeast Asia, South America, North America, Australia and Zealandia. Due to ongoing conflicts in the Middle East, many people are hoping to seek asylum in the European Union and Germany.
The vast majority of immigrants are residing in the so-called old states of Germany.

Immigration regulations

EU citizens

European Union free movement of workers principles require that all EU member state citizens have the right to solicit and obtain work in Germany regardless of citizenship. These basic rules for freedom of movement are given in Article 39 of the Treaty on the European Union.

Immigration options for non-EU citizens
Immigration to Germany as a non-EU-citizen is limited to skilled or highly educated workers and their immediate family members. In April 2012, European Blue Card legislation was implemented in Germany, allowing highly skilled non-EU citizens easier access to work and live in Germany. Although uptake of the scheme has grown steadily since then, its use remains modest; around 27,000 blue cards were issued in Germany in 2018.

Self-employment requires either an initial investment of EUR 250,000 and the creation of a minimum of 5 jobs.

2019 Skilled Immigration Act 
New regulations were enacted in 2020 in response to the 2019 Skilled Immigration Act. In order to qualify for a visa under the new rules, applicants must obtain official recognition of their professional qualification from a certification authority recognized by the German government. Further, the applicant must meet language competency requirements and obtain a declaration from their prospective employer.

Student visa
According to a study of the Federal Office for Migration and Refugees (BAMF), around 54 percent of foreign students in Germany decide to stay after graduation.

Asylum seekers and refugees

German asylum law is based on the 1993 amendment of article 16a of the Basic Law as well as on the 1951 Convention and 1967 Protocol relating to the Status of Refugees.

In accordance with the Convention Relating to the Status of Refugees, Germany grants refugee status to persons that are facing prosecution because of their race, religion, nationality or belonging to a special group. Since 2005, recognized refugees enjoy the same rights as people who were granted asylum. Germany's national ban on deportation doesn't permit returning refugees to their home country should doing so place them in imminent danger or that doing so would break EU human rights laws. This policy is a major catalyst to the large influx of Syrian refugees following the outbreak of the Syrian Civil War.

The distribution of refugees among the federal states is calculated using the "Königsteiner Schlüssel", which is recalculated annually.

Germany hosts one of the largest populations of Turkish people outside Turkey. Kurds makeup 80 to 90 percent of all Turkish refugees in Germany while the rest of the refugees are former Turkish military officers, teachers, and other types of public servants who fled the authoritarian government following the coup attempt in July 2016. Among Iraqi refugees in Germany, about 50 percent are Kurds. There are approximately 1.2 million Kurds in Germany.

An institute of forensic medicine in Münster determined the age of 594 of unaccompanied minors in 2019 and found that 234 (40%) were likely 18 years or older and would therefore be processed as adults by authorities. The sample was predominantly males from Afghanistan and Guinea.

In 2015, responding to relatively high numbers of unsuccessful asylum applications from several Balkan countries (Serbia, Albania, Kosovo and Montenegro), the German government formally declared these countries "generally safe" to speed up their processing.

Naturalization 

A person who has immigrated to Germany may choose to become a German citizen. The standard pathway to citizenship is known as Anspruchseinbürgerung (roughly, naturalization by entitlement). In this process, when the applicant fulfills certain criteria they are entitled to become German citizens; the decision is not generally subject to the judgment of a government official. The applicant must:
be a permanent resident of Germany
have lived in Germany legally for at least eight years, or seven years if they have passed the Integrationskurs
not live on welfare as the main source of income unless unable to work (for example, if the applicant is a single mother)
be able to speak German at a 'B1' level in the CEFR standard
pass a citizenship test. The examination tests a person's knowledge of the German constitution, the Rule of Law and the basic democratic concepts behind modern German society. It also includes a section on the constitution of the Federal State in which the applicant resides. The citizenship test is obligatory unless the applicant can claim an exemption such as illness, disability, or old age.
not have been convicted of a serious criminal offense
be prepared to swear an oath of loyalty to democracy and the German constitution
be prepared to renounce all former citizenships, unless the applicant obtains an exemption. The principal exemptions are:
 the applicant is a citizen of another European Union country, or of Switzerland;
 the applicant is a refugee, holding a 1951 convention travel document;
 the applicant is from a country where experience shows that it is impossible or extremely difficult to be released from nationality (such as Algeria, Brazil, Iran, Lebanon, Morocco, Syria, Tunisia);
 renunciation of their former citizenship would cause the applicant serious economic harm. A typical example is if the person would be unable to inherit property in the country of origin.
A person who does not fulfill all of these criteria may still apply for German citizenship by discretionary naturalisation (Ermessenseinbürgerung) as long as certain minimum requirements are met.

Spouses and same-sex civil partners of German citizens can be naturalised after only 3 years of residence (and two years of marriage).

Under certain conditions children born on German soil after the year 1990 are automatically granted German citizenship and, in most cases, also hold the citizenship of their parent's home country.

Applications for naturalisation made outside Germany are possible under certain circumstances, but are relatively rare.

Immigrant population in Germany by country of birth

According to the Federal Statistical Office of Germany in 2012, 92% of residents (73.9 million) in Germany had German citizenship, with 80% of the population being Germans (64.7 million) having no immigrant background. Of the 20% (16.3 million) people with immigrant background, 3.0 million (3.7%) had Turkish, 1.5 million (1.9%) Polish, 1.2 million (1.5%) Russian and 0.85 million (0.9%) Italian background.

In 2014, most people without German citizenship were Turkish (1.52 million), followed by Polish (0.67 million), Italian (0.57 million), Romanians (0.36 million) and Greek citizens (0.32 million).

, the most common groups of resident foreign nationals in Germany were as follows:

Comparison with other European Union countries
According to Eurostat, 47.3 million people living in the European Union in 2010 were born outside their resident country which corresponds to 9.4% of the total EU population. Of these, 31.4 million (6.3%) were born outside the EU and 16.0 million (3.2%) were born in another EU member state. The largest absolute numbers of people born outside the EU were in Germany (6.4 million), France (5.1 million), the United Kingdom (4.7 million), Spain (4.1 million), Italy (3.2 million), and the Netherlands (1.4 million).

Crime

Only a very small percentage, around 4%, of immigrants in Germany are accused of committing crimes. Non-German citizens are, in general, over-represented among suspects in criminal investigations (see horizontal bar chart). However, the complex nature of the data means it is not straightforward to make observations about the crime rates among immigrants. One factor is that crimes committed by foreign nationals are twice as likely to be reported as those committed by German citizens. In addition, the clearance rate (the percentage of crimes that are solved successfully) is extremely low in some categories, such as pickpocketing (5% solved) and burglaries (17% solved). When considering solved crimes only, non-German nationals make up around 8% of all suspects.

A disproportionate number of organized crime families in Germany are run by immigrants or their children. One-fifth of investigations into organized crime involve one or more non-German suspects. This has been attributed to the lack of effort made to integrate newly arrived immigrants in the 1960s and 1970s, who at the time were seen as "temporary" guest workers.

References

Further reading
 Czymara, Christian S., and Alexander W. Schmidt-Catran. "Refugees unwelcome? Changes in the public acceptance of immigrants and refugees in Germany in the course of Europe's ‘immigration crisis’." European Sociological Review 33.6 (2017): 735-751. online
 Ellermann, Antje. The Comparative Politics of Immigration: Policy Choices in Germany, Canada, Switzerland, and the United States (Cambridge University Press, 2021).
 Green, Simon. "Germany: A changing country of immigration." German Politics 22.3 (2013): 333–351. online
 Hertner, Isabelle. "Germany as ‘a country of integration’? The CDU/CSU's policies and discourses on immigration during Angela Merkel's Chancellorship." Journal of Ethnic and Migration Studies (2021): 1-21.
 Joppke, Christian. Immigration and the nation-state: the United States, Germany, and Great Britain (Clarendon Press, 1999), compartative responses.
 Kurthen, Hermann. "Germany at the crossroads: national identity and the challenges of immigration." International Migration Review 29.4 (1995): 914–938. online
 Mushaben, Joyce Marie. "A Spectre Haunting Europe: Angela Merkel and the Challenges of Far-Right Populism." German Politics and Society 38.1 (2020): 7-29.
 Piatkowska, Sylwia J., Andreas Hövermann, and Tse-Chuan Yang. "Immigration Influx as a Trigger for Right-Wing Crime: A Temporal Analysis of Hate Crimes in Germany in the Light of the ‘Refugee Crisis’." The British Journal of Criminology 60.3 (2020): 620-641.
 Schmidt-Catran, Alexander W., and Dennis C. Spies. "Immigration and welfare support in Germany." American Sociological Review 81.2 (2016): 242–261. online
 Thrädhardt, Dietrich. "Germany's immigration policies and politics." in Mechanisms of Immigration control: a comparative analysis of European regulation policies (Routledge, 2020) pp. 29–57.
 Vierra, Sarah Thomsen. Turkish Germans in the Federal Republic of Germany: Immigration, Space, and Belonging, 1961–1990 (Cambridge University Press, 2018).

External links

"6.180,013" Ausländer in Deutschland 
"Unsere Aufnahmekapazität ist begrenzt, ..." 
German Foreign Office
Facts & Figures in English Mediendienst Integration
Federal Office for Migration and Refugees
Make it in Germany The Federal Government

 
Foreign relations of Germany

de:Einwanderung#Einwanderung nach Deutschland